Atractus tamessari is a species of snake in the family Colubridae. The species can be found in Venezuela and Guyana.

References 

Atractus
Reptiles of Guyana
Reptiles of Venezuela]
Snakes of South America
Reptiles described in 2006